The Ministry of Finance is the government ministry of Austria responsible for the collection of taxes and customs as well as the administration of fiscal and economic policy. It oversees the Revenue Service, the Revenue Service for Large Businesses, the Financial Police, and various other agencies.

It is headquartered in the Winter Palace of Prince Eugene, Vienna. The current Minister is Magnus Brunner.

Structure and function
The Ministry is responsible for revenue administration at the federal level, including the government budget, matters of finance concerning the European Union, taxes, duties and tariffs. It defines and conducts the country's budgetary policy concerning currency, credit, savings banks (Sparkassen) and exchange matters, capital movements and settlement, insurance control and hallmarks. It is also concerned with economic policy, if not discharged by the Ministry of Economy.

The Finance Minister and the General Secretary chair six departments (Sektionen):
Dept. I: Office of the Minister
Dept. II: Federal budget
Dept. III: Economic policy and financial markets
Dept. IV: Taxes and tariffs
Dept. V: Information technology
Dept. VI: Fiscal policy and tax law

History

A first Hofkammer (court chamber) stewardship for the Austrian lands was established in Vienna by Archduke Ferdinand I, in order to balance the deficient Habsburg budget. Re-established by Maria Theresa in 1760, the chamber became the k.k. Finance Ministry of the Austrian Empire upon the Revolutions of 1848 and took its seat at the former city palace of Prince Eugene.

After the Austro-Hungarian Compromise of 1867, the Austrian Finance Minister was only responsible for the Cisleithanian crown lands, while for the common financial policy of the real union, a separate Austro-Hungarian k.u.k. Finance Ministry was established. After World War I, the First Austrian Republic implemented a Staatsamt für Finanzen, which was renamed upon the adoption of the Austrian Constitution (B-VG) in 1920.

List of Ministers

See also
 Thomas Wieser – former Director General for Economic Policy and Financial Markets

External links
Official website

1848 establishments in the Austrian Empire
Austria, Finance
Austria
Finance
Lists of government ministers of Austria